Juan Cruz Guillemaín (born 21 August 1992) is an Argentine rugby union footballer who plays as a lock for the Argentine Super Rugby side  and the Argentina national rugby union team.

Career

Cruz started his career playing for his local club, San Juan, before heading to Europe in 2012 to sign for Parisian side Stade Français along with compatriot Lisandro Gómez López. He made his Top 14 debut during the 2012-13 season, however his appearances for Stade had largely been limited to the European Challenge Cup since then.

International career

Cruz was a member of the Argentina Under-20 side which finished 4th in the 2012 IRB Junior World Championship, he also represented the Argentina Jaguars side in 2012 and 2014.

References

1992 births
Living people
People from San Juan, Argentina
Rugby union locks
Stade Français players
Jaguares (Super Rugby) players
Argentine rugby union players
Argentina international rugby union players
Argentine expatriate rugby union players
Argentine expatriate sportspeople in France
Expatriate rugby union players in France
Sportspeople from San Juan Province, Argentina